Nanxi is a town on the Chinese-Vietnamese border in Hekou Yao Autonomous County, Yunnan province, China. , it had seven residential neighborhoods and four villages under its administration.
Neighborhoods
Mahuangpu Community
Xiaonanxi Community
Zhennan Community
Xidong Community
Maxike Community
Si'erjiu Community
Guantang Community

 Villages
Nanxi Village
Longpu Village
Dananxi Village
Anjiahe Village

See also 
 List of township-level divisions of Yunnan

References 

Township-level divisions of Honghe Hani and Yi Autonomous Prefecture
Hekou Yao Autonomous County